Mullah Mohammad Yaqoob Mujahid (Pashto/, ; born 1990) is an Afghan Islamic scholar, cleric, and Islamist militant who is the second deputy leader of Afghanistan and the acting defense minister. He has been a deputy leader of the Taliban since 2016, and was additionally appointed to his ministerial role after the Taliban's victory over Western-backed forces in the 2001–2021 war. He has also been the Taliban's military chief since 2020.

Biography
Mullah Yaqoob is an ethnic Pashtun of the Hotak tribe, which is part of the larger Ghilji branch. He is the eldest son of the late Taliban founder Mohammed Omar. He received his religious education in various seminaries in Karachi, Pakistan.

When his father died in April 2013 and rumors escalated that he had been assassinated by rival Akhtar Mansour, Yaqoob denied the rumor, insisting that his father had died of natural causes.

Leadership positions
In 2016, Yaqoob was assigned by the Taliban to be in charge of the military commission in 15 of Afghanistan's 34 provinces. The military commission, then headed by Ibrahim Sadr, is responsible for overseeing all military affairs of the Taliban. In addition, Yaqoob was included in the Taliban's top decision-making council, the Rehbari Shura.

Mansour's death was announced on 21 May 2016 and he was replaced by Hibatullah Akhundzada as the Taliban leader. Sirajuddin Haqqani, a deputy to Mansour and leader of the Haqqani network, retained his position as Taliban deputy leader to Akhundzada, and Yaqoob was appointed the second deputy to the Taliban chief.

COVID-19 pandemic
On 7 May 2020 he was appointed head of the Taliban military commission, replacing Sadr and making Yaqoob the insurgents' military chief. On 29 May 2020, influential senior Taliban commander Mualana Muhammad Ali Jan Ahmed told Foreign Policy that Yaqoob became the acting leader to the entire Taliban after Akhundzada and First Deputy Leader Sirajuddin Haqqani became ill with COVID-19, stating "Our hero, the son of our great leader, Mullah Yaqoob, is running the entire Taliban operation in Haibatullah's absence."

Provisional Taliban government
Yaqoob is the acting defense minister of Afghanistan in the Caretaker Cabinet of the Islamic Emirate, appointed on 7 September 2021.

In December 2022, Yaqoob met with UAE President Mohamed bin Zayed Al Nahyan in Abu Dhabi. They discussed strengthening of relations between the UAE and Afghanistan.

Views
Mohammed Yaqoob supported a negotiated settlement to the War in Afghanistan. An avid supporter of former leader of the Taliban Akhtar Mansour, Yaqoob is pro-Saudi, has a reputation as a peace-advocating moderate, and is believed to have ties with the former government of Afghanistan. He also believes that the enforcement of Sharia should co-exist with basic international norms. Yaqoob also favours diplomatic reproach with India and is sceptical of Pakistani involvement in the Taliban.

References

1990 births
Living people
Pashtun people
Taliban leaders
Children of national leaders
Defence ministers of Afghanistan
Afghan warlords